Sir William Wilfred Sullivan (December 6, 1839 – September 30, 1920) was a Prince Edward Island journalist, politician and jurist, the fourth premier of Prince Edward Island.

A native of Hope River, Sullivan had a career as an assistant editor at the Charlottetown Herald as well as a lawyer before being elected to the provincial legislature in 1872 as a Liberal MLA.

A staunch Catholic, Sullivan became leader of the opposition in 1877 to the Protestant coalition government of Louis Henry Davies which had been formed to implement a public, secular school system that denied funding to Roman Catholic separate schools. Sullivan reorganised the Conservative Party and was asked by the lieutenant governor to become premier once Davies' coalition broke up and became unable to command a majority in the assembly.

Sullivan served as premier for ten years and fought for PEI's rights in Canada. He protested the federal government's failure to fulfill the terms of confederation on which the island had joined the dominion in 1873. In 1886, he petitioned the Imperial government in London protesting Canada's delinquency in respect to promises to ensure communication lines between the island and the rest of the country but the problem remained unresolved until the 1900s.

In 1889, Sullivan was appointed Chief Justice of PEI and served in that position until his retirement in 1917. In 1914 he was made a Knight Bachelor by King George V.

External links 
Biography at the Dictionary of Canadian Biography Online

1839 births
1920 deaths
People from Queens County, Prince Edward Island
Canadian Knights Bachelor
Canadian Roman Catholics
Premiers of Prince Edward Island
Prince Edward Island Liberal Party MLAs
Progressive Conservative Party of Prince Edward Island leaders